Ümit Aydın (born January 16, 1980) is a Turkish retired footballer who last played for Tepecikspor. Born in Istanbul, Turkey, he played defensive and center midfield. Standing at 183 cm. He played for Galatasaray, Adanaspor, Beşiktaş, Ankaraspor, Antalyaspor, Eskişehirspor, Kayserispor, Istanbulspor and now Bursaspor.

Honours
Galatasaray
UEFA Super Cup: 1 (2000)

External links
Profile at TFF.org

1980 births
Living people
Turkish footballers
Süper Lig players
Adanaspor footballers
Beşiktaş J.K. footballers
Ankaraspor footballers
Antalyaspor footballers
Kayserispor footballers
İstanbulspor footballers
Bursaspor footballers
Turkey youth international footballers

Association football midfielders